= 1953–54 Plunket Shield season =

Cricket tournament in New Zealand

1953–54 Plunket Shield
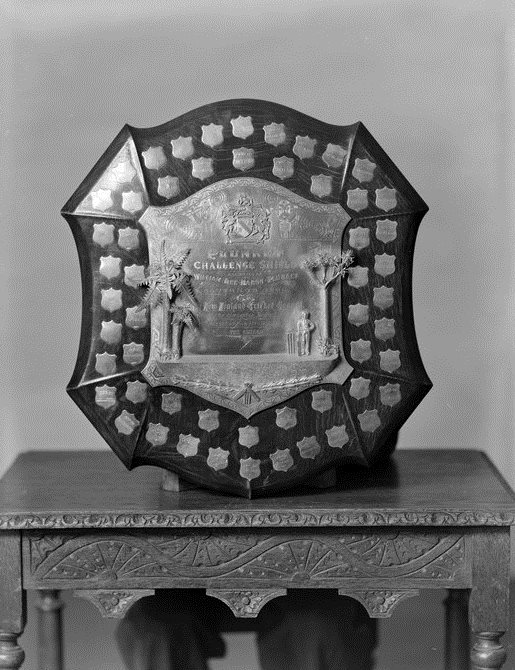
- The Plunket Shield trophy
- Cricket format: First-class
- Tournament format(s): Round-robin
- Champions: Central Districts (1st title)
- Participants: 5
- Matches: 10

The 1953–54 Plunket Shield season was a tournament of the Plunket Shield, the domestic first-class cricket competition of New Zealand.

Central Districts won the championship, finishing at the top of the points table at the end of the round-robin tournament between the five first-class sides, Auckland, Canterbury, Central Districts, Otago and Wellington. Eight points were awarded for a win, four points for having a first innings lead in a draw and two points for a first innings deficit in a draw.

== Table ==
Below are the Plunket Shield standings for the season:

| Team | Played | Won | Lost | Drawn | Points | NetRpW |
|---|---|---|---|---|---|---|
| Central Districts | 4 | 3 | 0 | 1 | 28 | 4.642 |
| Auckland | 4 | 2 | 1 | 1 | 20 | 1.792 |
| Otago | 4 | 2 | 2 | 0 | 16 | -0.038 |
| Canterbury | 4 | 1 | 2 | 1 | 10 | 5.144 |
| Wellington | 4 | 0 | 3 | 1 | 2 | -13.263 |
